Vin or VIN may refer to:

Arts, entertainment, and media
 Vîn TV, a Kurdish language satellite television channel founded in 2007
 Vos Iz Neias?, an American Jewish online news site
 Coastal radio station VIN Geraldton (callsign), a station in the former Australian coastal radio service

Fictional characters
 Vin, a character in the video games Jak II and Jak 3
 Vin, the primary character in the Mistborn series by Brandon Sanderson
 Vin Gonzales, a Spider-Man/Marvel Comics supporting character
 Vin Petrol, a character in the Corner Shop Show

Places
 Havryshivka Vinnytsia International Airport (IATA code), Vinnytsia, Ukraine
 Vin, California, an unincorporated community in the US
 Saint Vincent and the Grenadines (country code)

Science and technology
 Vehicle identification number, a 17-character unique identifying code for motor vehicles
 Voltage input (Vin); for example in a voltage divider
 Vulvar intraepithelial neoplasia, particular changes that can occur in the skin that covers the vulva
 VIN cloning, rebranding stolen vehicles

People

Vincent
 Vin Baker (born 1971), American basketball player
 Vin Baston (1919–1963), Irish hurler
 Vin Brown (1922–1989), Australian rules footballer 
 Vin Campbell (1888–1969), American baseball player
 Vin Coutie (1881–1951), Australian rules footballer
 Vin Di Bona (born 1944), American television producer
 Vin Garbutt (born 1947), English folk singer and songwriter
 Vin Gardiner (1885–1972), Australian rules footballer
 Vin Heffernan (1935–2002), Australian politician
 Vin Mazzaro (born 1986), American baseball pitcher
 Vin Sabbatucci (1935–2007), Australian rules footballer
 Vin Scelsa (born 1947), American radio personality
 Vin Scully (1927–2022), American sportscaster
 Vin Sullivan (1911–1999), American comic book editor, artist and publisher
 Vin Waite (1949–2003), Australian rules footballer
 Vin Weber (born 1952), American politician

Other or indeterminate
 Vin Abrenica (born 1991), Filipino actor
 Vin Arthur (1905–1970), Australian rules footballer
 Vin Batchelor (1900–1981), Australian rules footballer
 Vin Bruce (born 1932), American Cajun musician
 Vin Catoggio (born 1954), former Australian rules footballer
 Vin Choi (born 1984), Hong Kong actor
 Vin Crowe (born 1946), former Australian rules footballer
 Vin Diesel, stage name of American actor, director, screenwriter, and producer Mark Sinclair (born 1967)
 Vin Doherty (1911–1982), Australian rules footballer
 Vin Doolan (born 1952), former Australian rules footballer
 Vin Gerard (born 1986), American former professional wrestler
 Vin Gordon (born 1949), Jamaican trombone player
 Vin Lananna (born 1953) American track and field coach
 Vin Moore (1879–1949), American film director, actor and writer
 Vin Suprynowicz (born c. 1950), American libertarian writer and journalist

Other uses
 Vinza language (ISO 639-3 code), Tanzania

See also
 Vins (disambiguation)